Mike Speedy is a Republican member of the Indiana House of Representatives representing the 90th district where he has served since 2010. He previously served as an Indianapolis City Councilman for the 24th district from 2004-2010.  The American Conservative Union has given him a lifetime Legislature score of 90%. He earned a BS from the Kelley School of Business and a JD from the Indiana University Robert H. McKinney School of Law.

Mike Speedy does not support abortion in most circumstances, and has voted against exceptions for rape and incest.

References

External links
Mike Speedy at Ballotpedia
Project Vote Smart – Representative Mike Speedy (IN) profile
Our Campaigns – Representative Mike Speedy (IN) profile
State House Website
https://cm.indystar.com/specialoffer

1968 births
Living people
Republican Party members of the Indiana House of Representatives
21st-century American politicians
Indianapolis City-County Council members